Anne Sargent (born Helen W. Thomas; November 18, 1923 – July 23, 2007) was a film and stage actress from West Pittston, Pennsylvania, who performed in theater under the direction of Alfred Lunt, in 1948–1950. She is perhaps best known for her role as Mrs. Halloran in the 1948 motion picture The Naked City.

Career
In March 1949 Sargent was featured in a production of I Know My Love at the Biltmore Theatre, in Los Angeles, California, which starred Lunt and Lynn Fontanne. In July 1950, she was signed by Metro Goldwyn Mayer to act in Three Guys Named Mike.

On television, she played in the Bewitched episode "A Strange Little Visitor" and appeared on Perry Mason in 1958 as Eileen Harrison, wife of the title character, in "The Case of the Married Moonlighter".

Personal life
Sargent's first marriage was to Edmon Ryan, an actor with Warner Brothers.
Sargent accompanied her second husband, Paul McGrath, to England in 1978. McGrath, the voice of Inner Sanctum Mysteries in the 1940s and early 1950s, died in his sleep while the couple were staying in London, England.

Sargent's daughter with Ryan is actress Hilary Shelton Ryan, who studied at the Tudor Hall School, in Wickham Park, near Banbury, England.

References

External links

 
 

1923 births
American film actresses
American stage actresses
Actresses from Pennsylvania
2007 deaths
20th-century American actresses
21st-century American women